Diéoura is a rural commune and village in the Cercle of Diéma in the Kayes Region of western Mali. The commune contains 5 villages: Diéoura, Tassara, Foulanguédou, Madina-Bambara and Niankan. In the 2009 census the commune had a population of 10,137.

References

Communes of Kayes Region